The  Mercedes-Benz W116 is a series of flagship luxury sedans produced from September 1972 until 1980. The W116 automobiles were the first Mercedes-Benz models to be officially called S-Class, although earlier sedan models had already unofficially been designated with the letter 'S' – for Sonderklasse or "special class." The W116 was selected European Car of the Year in 1974.

History
The 'new' S-class generation development began in 1966, which was only a year after the launch of the W108/09. This was the first Mercedes saloon to feature the brand new corporate styling theme which was to be continued until 1993 when the 190 was discontinued. The design, finalized in December 1969 was a dramatic leap forward, with more masculine lines that combined to create an elegant and sporty character. The basic design concept carried through the themes originally introduced on the R107 SL-Class roadster, especially the front and rear lights. As for the SL, the W116 received the ridged lamp covers which kept dirt accumulation at bay; this was to remain a Mercedes-Benz design theme into the 21st century. The W116 was Friedrich Geiger's last design for Mercedes-Benz; his career had started with the Mercedes-Benz 500K in 1933.

The car was presented in September 1972. The model range initially included two versions of the M110 engine (straight-six with 2746 cc displacement) — the 280 S (using a Solex carburetor) and the 280 SE (using Bosch D-Jetronic injection), plus the 350 SE, powered by the M116 engine (V8 with 3499 cc displacement). After the 1973 oil crisis, a long-wheelbase 280 SEL was added to the model range.

The larger 4.5-litre M117 V8 engines were developed in response to the US emission regulations and initially fitted to 350 SL and 350 SLC for the US market in 1972, which was renamed as 450 SL and 450 SLC in 1973. Mercedes-Benz introduced 450 SE and 450 SEL for both US and international markets in 1973. The 4.5-litre models were available with three-speed automatic gearboxes only while the models with smaller 3.5-litre V8 engine could be ordered with four-speed (and later five-speed) manual gearbox. The 450 SE and 450 SEL received a plusher interior with velour or leather seats rather than the checkered cloth of the lesser models. The door cards had the velour or leather inserts.

The 450s received a plusher interior as well, with velour or leather seats rather than the checkered cloth of the lesser models. The door cards were also of a different design with pads being pulled up around the windows.

The W116 had independent suspension and disk brakes on all four wheels.

The most notable W116 was the high-performance, limited-production 450 SEL 6.9, which was introduced in 1975. This model boasted the largest engine installed in a post-war Mercedes-Benz (and any non-American production automobile) up to that time, and also featured self-leveling hydropneumatic suspension.

Exclusive to the North American and Japanese markets, 300 SD, the world’s first passenger car with turbocharged diesel engine was introduced in 1978. This particular model was never offered in Europe where diesel engines were well-received and had tax advantages until 1991 when W140 300SD was finally introduced in Europe and international market.

The 450 SE was named the European Car of the Year in 1974, even though the W116 range was first introduced at the Paris Motor Show in the fall of 1972. The W116 range became the first production car to use an electronic four-wheel multi-channel anti-lock braking system (ABS) from Bosch as an option from 1978 on.

Production totaled 473,035 units. The W116 was succeeded by the W126 S-Class in 1979. The W116 was sold throughout Europe, the Americas, Asia, the Middle East, Africa, and Australia.

Fuel Injection

In 1975, the W116 was upgraded with a new fuel injection system to comply with revised exhaust emission standards in European markets. A slight power reduction was a result of this update. In 1978, a series of engine upgrades restored original performance levels with new fuel injection systems. Initially the early models (1973-1974) of the W116 with the Twin Cam inline 6 used the D-Jetronic fuels injection system with computers and MAP sensor that are both prone to failure after more than 20 years of use. From 1975 onward they used the K-Jetronic mechanical fuel injection system, a less complicated system that proved to be much more reliable in the long run and injectors cost 6x less than the D-jetronic system. The W116 equipped with the K-Jetronic system, used a cast-iron fuel distributor, which can be prone to rust over time if moisture or water is present in the fuel. This was changed to an alloy fuel distributor in the following model W126 and is not subject to corrosion.

Hydropneumatic Suspension
W116 was first model from Mercedes-Benz to feature the hydropneumatic suspension system. While the principle is similar to Citroën’s, Mercedes-Benz made some changes. The hydraulic pump was driven by the timing chain instead of rubber belt for more reliability (Citroën’s system would lead to loss of hydraulic power if belt failed). Mercedes-Benz utilised the hard rubber dampers as temporary dampers in event of hydraulic failure. The height adjustment had a smaller range of height as compared to Citroën (5 cm versus 50 cm). Unlike Citroën, the car did not “sink” to the ground after shutting off the engine, and the driver did not have to wait for the hydraulic power to spool up and lift the car to the operating height.

The full hydropneumatic suspension system was fitted to the 450 SEL 6.9 as standard. In 1977, the self-levelling rear suspension system was offered for 450 SEL as extra cost option outside the North American market.

North American sales

North America was a key market for the W116. The model range for the U.S. market at launch was 280 SE, 450 SE, and 450 SEL. For 1975, 280 S was launched as a response to the 1973 oil crisis. The 6.9 was added in 1977 with the MSRP of $38,230 while 280 S and 450 SE were dropped due to slow sales. 300 SD TURBODIESEL, the world’s first passenger car with turbocharged diesel engine, was launched in the United States and Canada in 1978: the S-Class model with turbocharged diesel engine was exclusive to the North American and Japanese markets until 1991.

 It had a turbocharged 3.0-litre inline-five diesel engine developed from that of the C111 experimental vehicle. It was developed to help Mercedes-Benz keep from falling afoul of the Corporate Average Fuel Economy (CAFE) standards introduced in 1975; it became a best seller and helped considerably lower Mercedes-Benz' average fuel economy.

Due to the modifications demanded by the U.S. Government, U.S. Models of the Mercedes-Benz W116 were described by journalists as if a "beautiful car was beaten with the malaise ugly stick."

450 SEL 6.9

The high-performance 450 SEL 6.9 version of the S-Class was built on its own assembly line by Daimler-Benz in Sindelfingen, Germany and based on the long-wheelbase version of the W116 chassis. The model was generally referred to in the company's literature as the "6.9", to separate it from the regular 450 SEL.

The 450 SEL 6.9 was first shown to the motoring press at the Geneva Auto Show in 1974 and produced between 1975 and 1981 in extremely limited numbers. It was billed as the flagship of the Mercedes-Benz car line and the successor to Mercedes-Benz's original high-performance sedan, the 300 SEL 6.3.

LeMons racing 
In September 2013, a 1979 W116 300 SD was campaigned in the 24 Hours of LeMons at Carolina Motorsports Park, where it completed 166 laps at an average speed of 54.8 MPH. It won the highest prize of the event, the Index of Effluency. Other than mild issues relating to brake and tire wear, no mechanical issues were encountered. After numerous modifications to handling, the car was again run in February 2014 at Barber Motorsports park in Birmingham, AL. It placed 44th, but turned 281 laps at an average pace of 59.6 MPH. One of the key advantages of the 300 SD in long-distance racing is its exceptional fuel economy on track, where it burns just 2.5 GPH (Roughly 18MPG). In July 2014 it placed first in class at Sebring. It is still active in the series.

Technical data
Technical data Mercedes-Benz W116  (Manufacturer's figures except where stated)

Features

The W116 S-Class incorporated a broad variety of Mercedes-Benz safety innovations.
 Four wheel anti-lock brakes were first featured as an option on the 1978 W116 S-Class. This system prevents the wheels from locking while braking. The system improves steering control during hard braking situations, and to shorten brake distances.
 Strengthened body structure.  The W116 featured a more stable security passenger cell with a stiffened roof frame structure. High strength roof and door pillars, along with other reinforced zones, provided enhanced vehicle occupant protection.
 Deformation zones (crumple zones) in the front and rear.
 A padded dashboard, deformable switches and controls, and a four-spoke steering wheel with impact absorber and broad impact cushion aimed to reduce occupant injury during collisions.
 The fuel tank was no longer fitted at the rear end, but was now placed above the rear axle for added protection.
 Wraparound turn signals made it easier to communicate with nearby drivers.

References

Bibliography

General

Workshop manuals

External links

 International M-100 Group — Factory-authorized site with information on all M-100-powered Mercedes-Benz automobiles, (including technical forums and maintenance information). The Brock Yates article can be found here as well
 A Mercedes for the '70s: The W116 Series S-Class — A site mixing the history of the full-scale W116 with that of its many miniature replicas.
 Classic Car driver review
 Golden Brown: Four Days in a Mercedes-Benz 450SEL 6.9 – Feature (Car and Driver)

W116
W116
Cars introduced in 1972
1980s cars
Rear-wheel-drive vehicles
Limousines